Robert Stanley Mitchell (January 27, 1922 – July 17, 1997) was an American football player who played at the halfback, quarterback, and defensive back positions. He played college football for Stanford and professional football for the Los Angeles Dons.

Early years
Mitchell was born in 1922 in Turlock, California. He attended and played football at Turlock High School.

Military and college football
He played college football for Stanford from 1940 to 1943. He also served in the United States Navy.

Professional football
In April 1946, Mitchell signed to play professional football in the All-America Football Conference for the Los Angeles Dons. He played for the Dons from 1946 to 1948, appearing in 37 games.

Later years
He died in 1997 at age 75.

References

1922 births
1997 deaths
Los Angeles Dons players
Stanford Cardinal football players
Players of American football from California
People from Turlock, California
American football halfbacks
American football quarterbacks
United States Navy personnel of World War II